General elections were held in South Africa on 2 June 1999. The result was a landslide victory for the governing African National Congress (ANC), which gained fourteen seats. Incumbent president Nelson Mandela declined to seek re-election as president on grounds of his age. This election was notable for the sharp decline of the New National Party, previously the National Party (NP), which without former State President F.W. de Klerk lost more than half of their former support base. The liberal Democratic Party became the largest opposition party, after being the fifth largest party in the previous elections in 1994. The number of parties represented in the National Assembly increased to thirteen, with the United Democratic Movement, jointly headed by former National Party member Roelf Meyer, and former ANC member Bantu Holomisa, being the most successful of the newcomers with fourteen seats.

National Assembly results

Provincial legislature results

Eastern Cape

Free State

Gauteng

KwaZulu-Natal

Mpumalanga

North West

Northern Cape

Northern Province

Western Cape

NCOP seats
The National Council of Provinces (NCOP) consists of 90 members, ten elected by each provincial legislature. The Members of NCOP have to be elected in proportion to the party membership of the provincial legislature.

Aftermath
Thabo Mbeki was elected president (unopposed) by the new Assembly on 14 June 1999, succeeding Nelson Mandela.

Notes

References

General elections in South Africa
South Africa
General
General Election